Ghost Ship is a 1952 British horror thriller film directed by Vernon Sewell and starring Dermot Walsh and Hazel Court. It was written by Vernon Sewell and Philip Thornton. This was one of four attempts by Vernon Sewell to adapt and film an obscure Pierre Mills and Celia de Vilyars Grand Guignol stage play, called L'Angoisse. It was shot at Merton Park Studios as a second feature.

The 2002 film of the same title is completely unrelated and not considered a remake.

Plot
Guy and Margret, a newly-wed couple, meet a broker in the hopes of buying the steam yacht Cyclops to fix it up as a floating home. Before they make the purchase the Yard Manager tells them about the ship's previous owners. He explains that after the war the yacht was bought by Professor Martineau, an atomic scientist who installed a number of gadgets including automatic gyro steering. Martineau, his wife, and their engineer and friend Peter, set sail on a pleasant day for Doville, however they never arrived. After being unable to contact the Cyclops an enquiry assumed they struck a mine and were lost at sea. A month later three fishermen discover the Cyclops devoid of crew and off course. Another enquiry is held and discovers that the ship must have been abandoned at least three days, the machinery and equipment was in perfect working order, no attempt had been made to contact another ship, and that one of the lifebuoys was missing, however they are unsure if the automatic steering was engaged. A body is found washed up on the beach, however Martineau's housekeeper explains it cannot be him as it doesn't have the burn scar Martineau received on his arm as a student. The enquiry concludes assuming two of those onboard must have drowned trying to save the third.

The Yard Manager tells Guy and Margret that the Cyclops has since changed hands many times but has never found a long-term owner. He also tells them that he believes the ship is haunted as he had mysteriously smelt cigar smoke, however Guy believes the Yard master is reluctant to sell as he uses the ship for smuggling. Guy and Margret buy the Cyclops after being told that it is in great shape and working perfectly and move it to a dry dock for overhaul and repainting. Unable to find a local deckhand, Guy reluctantly hires Mansel, who also doesn't believe the yacht is haunted and has been rather poorly looking after the Cyclops for years. Guy and Margret host a house-warming party onboard to celebrate their first successful trip out on the Cyclops, where a guest tells Guy he smells a Havana cigar despite none being present. That night the engineer hired to run the boat quits after claiming that his wife has become ill, however later the Yard Manager tells Guy that he doesn't believe the engineer had a wife at all and that a rumour is spreading that he left after seeing a ghost.

Guy hires a new engineer but Margret complains that he smokes cigars in their quarters as she can smell the smoke. When Guy goes to confront the engineer he quits, claiming to have seen a ghost on board as well. Margret receives a call from the bridge but hears only breathing, and discovers that Guy is only next door and Mansel has the evening off. When Guy and Margret investigate they find the bridge empty, however Margret smells cigar smoke again and faints. A worried Margret begins to believe something supernatural is happening, however Guy still believes someone is trying to trick them into abandoning the Cyclops. Later, while working in the engine room, Guy sees a man smoking a cigar who disappears when Guy challenges him. Debating whether to sell the Cyclops or not, Margret contacts the Institute for Investigation of Psychic Phenomena (IIPP) to hire a paranormal investigator.

Dr. Fawcett arrives and feels a strong psychic influence onboard the Cyclops after also smelling cigar smoke, although Guy still remains sceptical. Dr. Fawcett invites his medium Mrs. Manley onboard to host a séance where she contacts the spirits onboard. The group discover that Martineau's wife and Peter were having an affair and planned to kill Martineau and push him overboard. As Mrs. Martineau and Peter make their plan however, Martineau is able to hear them after breaking the phone on the bridge. Martineau confronts his wife and Peter and shoots them before hiding their bodies in a disused water tank under the floor boards, taking some money, changing the ship's course, and jumping overboard with one of the lifebuoys. Guy and Dr Fawcett find the water tank to confirm the story but before they can call the police, Mansel commits suicide on deck. After seeing a burn scar on Mansel's arm Guy realises that he is Professor Martineau. Dr Fawcett tells a still doubtful Guy that with Martineau dead the haunting should stop. Happy, Guy and Margret set sail on the Cyclops again.

Cast
 Dermot Walsh as Guy Thornton
 Hazel Court as Margaret Thornton
 Hugh Burden as Dr. Fawcett
 John Robinson as Prof. Mansel Martineau
 Hugh Latimer as Peter
 Joan Carol as Mrs. Martineau
 Joss Ambler as Yard Manager
 Mignon O'Doherty as Mrs. Manley
 Laidman Browne as Coroner
 Meadows White as Mr. Leech, Yard Surveyor
 Pat McGrath as Bert, 1st Fisherman
 Joss Ackland as Ron, 2nd Fisherman
 John King-Kelly as Sid 3rd Fisherman (as John King Kelly)
 Colin Douglas as 1st Engineer
 Jack Stewart as 2nd Engineer
 Anthony Marlowe as Thomas Selter (Lloyd's Surveyor)
 Geoffrey Dunn as Strange Passenger
 Ian Carmichael as Bernard
 Anthony Hayes as Pianist
 Barry Phelps as Stewardn
 Robert Moore as Police Inspector
 Ewen Solon as Plain Clothes Man
 Jock Finlay as Policeman
 Madoline Thomas as Mrs. Morgan, Housekeeper
 Graham Stuart as 1st Guest
 Gordon Bell as 2nd Guest
 Patricia Owens as Joyce - Party Girl
 Melissa Stribling as Vera - Party Girl

Production
The film received partial funding from Anglo-Amalgamated. It starred the real life husband and wife team of Dermot Walsh and Hazel Court. Most filming took place in Merton Park Studios with exteriors shot on the director's own yacht, Gelert in the English Channel.

The film features Ian Carmichael, briefly, as a drunken guest, in an early film role. It includes some limited shots of Shoreham Harbour canal, Southwick Town Hall, and Lady Bee Marina.

Critical reception
TV Guide called the film a "talky but fairly atmospheric effort...hampered by its low budget."

See also

 List of British films of 1952

References

 AMG. (n.d.). Ghost Ship| Cast Information. Retrieved 28 November 2010, from Fandango: www.fandango.com/ghostship_v19646/cast
 Adams, L. (n.d.). Ghost Ship (1952). Retrieved 28 November 2010, from IMDb: https://www.imdb.com/title/tt0044656/

External links
 
 

1952 films
1952 horror films
British horror thriller films
British black-and-white films
Films directed by Vernon Sewell
Seafaring films
Films set in England
1950s ghost films
1950s horror thriller films
British films based on plays
Merton Park Studios films
Uxoricide in fiction
Films scored by Eric Spear
1950s English-language films
1950s British films